The 1923 Oregon Agricultural Aggies football team represented Oregon Agricultural College (now known as Oregon State University) in the Pacific Coast Conference (PCC) during the 1923 college football season.  In their fourth and final season under head coach R. B. "Dick" Rutherford, the Beavers compiled a 4–5–2 record (1–3–1 against PCC opponents), finished in a tie for sixth place in the PCC, and were outscored by their opponents, 71 to 55. Tackle Percy Locey was the team captain. The team played its home games at Bell Field in Corvallis, Oregon.

In January 1924, coach Rutherford resigned as the school's football coach and director of athletics, effective at the end of his contract July 1, 1924. According to the Corvallis Gazette-Times, it had been "an open secret" that the alumni had been active in opposing Rutherford's retention. In four seasons under coach Rutherford, the Aggies compiled a losing record of 13–14–6 (4–10–3 against PCC opponents).

Schedule

References

Oregon Agricultural
Oregon State Beavers football seasons
Oregon Agricultural Aggies football